A feudal lordship is a feudal title that is held in baroneum, which Latin term means that its holder, who is called a feudal lord, is also always a feudal baron.  A feudal lordship is an ancient title of nobility. The holder may or may not be a Lord of Regality, which meant that the holder was appointed by the Crown and had the power of "pit and gallows", meaning the power to authorise the death sentence.

A Scottish feudal lord ranks above a Scottish feudal baron (being a feudal baron of a higher degree), but below a Lord of Parliament which is a title in the Peerage of Scotland, and below a feudal earldom, which is a feudal barony of still higher degree than a feudal lordship. There are far fewer feudal lordships than feudal baronies, whilst feudal earldoms are very rare.

While feudal barons originally sat in parliament (along with the lords and higher nobility who made up the Peerage), all of the peerage, originally, was within the feudal system.  Later, some of what used to be feudal lordships came to be known as peerages (such as that of The Right Honourable The Lord Forrester) while others were sold, inherited by greater peers, or otherwise disqualified from the modern-day peerage.  The feudal rights were gradually emasculated and, with the demise of the Scottish parliament in 1707, the right of feudal barons to sit in parliament ceased altogether, unless, that is, a feudal baron was also a Peer (Peerage rights are dealt with elsewhere).

Feudal lordships were all but abolished by Act of Parliament in 1747, following the Jacobite rising. A feudal barony no longer carries any political power as such, although the Abolition of Feudal Tenure etc. (Scotland) Act 2000 has preserved the baronies themselves, and the quality, precedence and heraldic rights pertaining to these baronies.

Between 1500 and 2000 feudal baronies may have been created, mostly in the 15th, 16th and 17th centuries, since only about 400 baronies are identified as existing in 1405. Because they fell into disuse, the substantiating paperwork for only a few hundred survives or has been identified. Burke's Landed Gentry for Scotland lists only about 130.

A peer is invariably addressed as 'Lord Placename' or 'Lord Such-and-so', whilst those holding a feudal lordship are addressed 'Lord of Placename' or 'Placename' and feudal barons are addressed as 'Baron of Placename' or 'Placename'.

A female feudal baron is usually referred to as 'Lady Placename'. The wife of a Lord receives the courtesy title 'Lady Placename', but the husband of a Lady, who holds a feudal barony in her own right, is just plain Mr. 'Surname'.

Lords of regality, feudal lords, and feudal barons are not to be confused with a manorial lordship.

Order of precedence of Scottish feudal titles 
Wallace states that: "Lordships, Earldoms, Marquessates and Dukedoms differ only in name from Baronies" but continues "one whose property was erected into a Lordship ranked before a simple Baron" and "A person to whom an Earldom belonged, would be superior to a person who had no more than a lordship ... One, whose lands were incorporated into a Marquessate, was superior to both ... A man, who owned a fief elevated into a Dukedom, was exhaulted above all three." 

The inference in terms of superiority from greater to lesser is thus: Feudal Duke, Feudal Marquess, Feudal Earl, Feudal Lord, Feudal Baron. (Note however that Lord Stair states that Lordships or Earldoms are "but more noble titles of a Barony".)

Usage

The holder of a Scottish feudal lordship, in similar fashion to the holder of a barony (e.g., "Inverglen"), may add the title to his existing name (e.g., "John Smith, Lord of Inverglen") or add the territorial designation to his surname ("John Smith of Inverglen, Lord of Inverglen"); some of the oldest Scottish families prefer to be styled by the territorial designation alone ("Smith of Inverglen").

According to the UK government, the current policy of using titles on passports requires that the applicant provides evidence that the Lord Lyon has recognised a feudal barony (or in this case feudal lordship), or the title is included in Burke's Peerage. If accepted (and if the applicant wishes to include the title), the correct form is for the applicant to include the territorial designation as part of their surname (Surname of territorial designation e.g. Smith of Inverglen). The Observation would then show the holder's full name, followed by their feudal title e.g. The holder is John Smith, Lord of Inverglen.

List of feudal lordships (created before 1707)
Below is an incomplete list of Scottish feudal lordships created in Scotland before 1707. 

a: The creation date is the earliest known date for the Lordship and subject to revision

b: The Barony of Hailes was granted to Adam de Hepburn by Patrick de Dunbar, Earl of March in 1343

See also
Peerage of Scotland 
Barons in Scotland
Feudal Earldom
Order of precedence in Scotland
English feudal barony
Marcher Lord (Welsh Marches)
Marcher Lord
 Register of the Great Seal of Scotland;
 Abolition of Feudal Tenure Act, Scotland;
 Statutes of 1592;
 Baronetcy Warrants of Charles I.

References

External links
The Lordship of Garioch
The Lordship & Barony of Kilmarnock
The Baronage
The Convention of The Baronage of Scotland

Medieval Scottish nobility
Feudalism in Scotland